Zahreddine, Zaher Eldin, Zaher al-Deen or Zahr Eddine (Arabic: زهر الدين) is an Arabic surname that may refer to

Issam Zahreddine (born 1961), a Major General of the Syrian Republican Guard
Lina Zahr Eddine (born 1982), Lebanese news presenter and talk show host

Arabic-language surnames